Notomma is a genus of tephritid  or fruit flies in the family Tephritidae. Hermannloewia is currently considered a synonym of Notomma.

References

Trypetinae
Tephritidae genera